Rowsell is a surname. Notable people with the surname include:

 Erick Rowsell (born 1990), British road racing cyclist
 Edmund Penning-Rowsell (1913–2002), British journalist
 Harry Rowsell (1921-2006), Canadian veterinarian, pathologist, animal welfare advocate and humanist
 Joanna Rowsell Shand (born 1988), British cyclist
 Leslie Rowsell Moore (1912-2003), Professor of Geology, described as "one of the founders of modern Carboniferous palynology"
 Norman Rowsell (1855-1919), Tea planter and first Ceylon Labour Commissioner
 Spud Rowsell (21st century), English sailboat racer
 Thomas James Rowsell (1816–1894), Canon of Westminster
 Francis William Rowsell CB CMG (1838–1885), British Commissioner of Egyptian State Domains
Ellie Rowsell (born 1992), British singer and guitarist of the band Wolf Alice.

See also
 The Rowsell-Julyan-Keenan Commission, a Royal Commission in 1878 that recommended in its report the Anglicisation of the educational and judicial systems of Malta.
 Dubuis & Rowsell, manufacturer of Rola Cola
 Penning-Rowsell
 Roswell (disambiguation)